Peter Pan is an American brand of peanut butter that is marketed by Post Consumer Brands, part of Post Holdings, and is named after the J. M. Barrie character. The product was introduced by Swift & Company (originally through their "Derby Foods" subsidiary) in 1920 under the name "E. K. Pond" and renamed in 1928.

History
Originally packaged in a tin can with a turn key and reclosable lid, the product's packaging was changed to glass jars because of metal shortages during World War II. In 1988, Peter Pan was the first brand of peanut butter to be sold in plastic jars.

The product was the main ingredient in Frankford Candy & Chocolate Company's now-discontinued product, Peter Pan Peanut Butter Cups.

Past spokesmen for Peter Pan have included actor Sterling Holloway, actor Mark Linn-Baker, comedian Alan Sues, and game show host Art James.

In late August 2007, it was announced that Disney's version of the Peter Pan character would become the mascot for Peter Pan Peanut Butter, alongside many other characters from Disney's 1953 animated film version to appear in their new advertising campaign, possibly in 2009. This would not be the first time: in the mid-1950s, when Peter Pan cosponsored ABC's Disneyland TV series, Tinker Bell often appeared in their ads during the program.

In earlier versions of the product, Peter Pan was clearly pictured as a woman in a Peter Pan costume, rather than as a boy. This would have fit very nicely into the then-usual tradition of having the character played by an actress in J. M. Barrie's play or the musical made from it, were it not for the fact that the model used for the peanut butter label appeared very feminine, with long hair and a green skirt, unlike the actresses who had played Peter onstage. All of them had had their hair cropped short for the role and wore green pants rather than a long green skirt.

Peter Pan Peanut Butter is currently sold in 10 varieties: Creamy Original, Crunchy Original, Creamy Whipped, Creamy Honey Roast, Crunchy Honey Roast, Natural Creamy, Natural Creamy Honey Roast, Original Almond Butter, Vanilla Roast Almond Butter, and Honey Roast Almond Butter.

On December 8, 2020, Conagra announced that it would sell the Peter Pan brand to Post Holdings. The transaction was completed on January 25, 2021.

Incidents

Say When!! incident
During a 1964 episode of the NBC game show Say When!!, host Art James performed a commercial for Peter Pan, during which he unintentionally broke the glass jar he used as a prop.  Before air time, James did a series of run-throughs, dropping a table knife into the near-empty Peter Pan jar, each time without incident.  But when he did the actual commercial live on the air, the knife broke out the bottom of the jar and fell through onto his podium.  Amid scattered laughter from the audience, James continued the spot as the bottom part of the jar came "unglued" from the peanut butter.  At the end of the commercial, James finally lost his composure and stated that "It's great peanut butter; the jar is something else."  The incident has been replayed on many TV blooper specials through the years.

Recall

In February 2007, Peter Pan and some Great Value (Walmart's store brand) peanut butters were linked to 425 cases of salmonellosis across the United States. Centers for Disease Control and Prevention officials believe this is the first Salmonella outbreak involving peanut butter to occur in the United States.

The recall involved both Peter Pan and some Great Value peanut butter with a product code starting with the digits "2111". The recall included all ConAgra-produced peanut butter sold in the United States since October 2004. Peter Pan products returned to stores in late August 2007.

During the January 2009 peanut butter recall, the Peanut Corporation of America recalled 21 lots of peanut butter from their plant in Blakely, Georgia, over the possibility of Salmonella contamination. Although this initially caused concern among consumers, Peter Pan has confirmed that no ingredients used to make its peanut butter have come from any location operated by Peanut Corporation of America.

References

External links

Peanut butter brands
Peter Pan
Products introduced in 1920